is a 1997 Japanese animated film based on the My Father's Dragon children's books by Ruth Stiles Gannett and their illustrations by Ruth Chrisman Gannett.

Cast

Elmer Elevator: Yu-ki (TRF)
Boris the Dragon: Megumi Hayashibara 
Cat: Jōji Yanami
Male Gorilla: Daisuke Gōri
Nearsighted Rat: Masako Nozawa
Lion: Katsuhisa Namase
Lioness: Sumiko Sakamoto
Elmer's Mother: Maiko Kikuchi
Elmer's Father: Masahiro Takashima
Seagull: Naoki Tatsuta
Wild Boars: Kazuki Yao, Bin Shimada
Rhino: Yusaku Yara
Tigers: Banjō Ginga, Ikuya Sawaki, Masaharu Satō, Kōzō Shioya, Kenyu Horiuchi
Rōjī: Chiaki
Rōdā: Ikuko Takeuchi
Female Gorilla: Hiroko Emori
Alligators: Masato Amada, Hirohiko Kakegawa
Store Owner: Kazumi Tanaka
Rachel: Junichi Sugawara
Roberta: Takumi Yamazaki
Lucy: Makiko Ōmoto

Staff

Distribution: Shochiku
Director: Masami Hata
Executive Producer: Shunji Yoshida
Production Heads: Kazuyoshi Okuyama, Masatoshi Sakai
Producers: Satoshi Nagashima, Minami Kishimoto
Original Story: Ruth Stiles Gannett
Screenplay: Kenji Terada
Planning: Yūji Tanitabe, Hideki Higuchi, Fumio Sameshima
Supervising Animation Director: Yutaka Arai
Character Design: Shūichi Seki
Cinematography: Hideki Imaizumi
Special Effects: Yoshio Kihara
Art Director: Minoru Nishida
Editor: Hajime Okayasu
Music: Naoto Kine
Music Supervisor: Tetsuya Komuro

Theme songs

Dragons' DanceOpening theme by Yu-ki
Lyrics by Tetsuya Komuro, Marc
Composed by Tetsuya Komuro
If You Wish…Ending theme by Takashi Utsunomiya
Lyrics by Marc
Composed by Tetsuya Komuro

Releases

Albums

Elmer no Bōken Original SoundtrackReleased 1997-07-21, 34 tracks, CD, Sony Music Entertainment

Video
Elmer no BōkenReleased 1998-12-05 (both limited and regular), color, VHS (NTSC), Shochiku

See also
List of animated feature-length films

External links
  at Shochiku Films
 
 
 Indies 

1990s children's animated films
1997 anime films
1997 films
Adventure anime and manga
Animated films about dragons
Animated films based on children's books
Anime films based on novels
Films directed by Masami Hata
Japanese animated fantasy films
Japanese children's fantasy films
Japanese fantasy adventure films

ja:エルマーの冒険